Isabelle Corey (29 May 1939 – 6 February 2011) was a French actress and model.

Corey started modeling in Paris in her teens for magazines such as Jardin des Modes, Elle and Madame Figaro. She was discovered in the Latin Quarter, where she lived with her parents, by Jean Pierre Melville and was offered the lead in his classic film noir, Bob le flambeur. 

Following parts in such films as And God Created Woman, she continued her film career in Italy where she settled in Rome, to work with such producers, directors and actors as Mauro Bolognini, Vittorio De Sica, Marcello Mastroianni, Alberto Sordi, Dino De Laurentiis and Roberto Rossellini.

Filmography

External links
 
"Brigitte Bardot and Isabelle Corey", Cult Sirens

1939 births
2011 deaths
French film actresses
Actors from Metz
French female models
Deaths from cancer in France